"'Days of Light'" is a song by Roger Daltrey from his eighth solo album, Rocks in the Head. The song was written by Daltrey and Gerard McMahon, and features lyrics about looking forward to the weekend. According to Daltrey, the song was inspired by his early career as a worker in a sheet-metal factory.

Rocks in the Head was recorded at The Hit Factory in New York City and released on the Atlantic Records label  in 1992. Production is credited to Gerald McMahon, who also performed as a musician.

When performing the song live at Vancouver, Daltrey forgot the lyrics partway. He explained that it was only the second time he had sung it in his life, so the other time must have been when he did it on Late Night with David Letterman, as documented on YouTube. At any rate, he did not seem too flustered by the slip-up; it was, after all, the first show of his first solo tour since 1985. He just cheerfully started the song over again.

This track and "Who's Gonna Walk on Water" were the only tracks from Rocks in the Head performed live.

The song is considered to sound like Bruce Springsteen.

Complete live performances of "Days of Light"
Below is the complete performances of the songs by Roger Daltrey live.

2009;

 10.10.2009: Vancouver, BC 
 12.10.2009: Seattle, WA 
 14.10.2009: San Francisco, CA 
 15.10.2009: Highland, CA 
 17.10.2009: Los Angeles, CA 
 20.10.2009: Denver, CO 
 22.10.2009: Thackerville, OK 
 24.10.2009: Biloxi, MS
 25.10.2009: Jacksonville, FL
 28.10.2009: Durham, NC 
 30.10.2009: Nashville, TN 
 31.10.2009: Elizabeth, IN 
 02.11.2009: Chicago, IL 
 03.11.2009: Cleveland, OH 
 05.11.2009: Orillia, ON 
 07.11.2009: Mashantucket, CT 
 08.11.2009: Boston, MA 
 11.11.2009: Montclair, NJ 
 13.11.2009: Atlantic City, NJ 
 17.11.2009: Red Bank, NJ 
 18.11.2009: Norfolk, VA 
 20.11.2009: New York, NY 
 22.11.2009: Charlotte, NC 
 24.11.2009: Charleston, SC 
 25.11.2009: Buena Vista, FL 
 27.11.2009: Ft. Myers, FL 
 29.11.2009: Hollywood, FL 
 30.11.2009: Clearwater, FL 
2010;

 25.02.2010: Pittsburgh, PA 
 27.02.2010: Nashville, TN 
 28.02.2010: Birmingham, AL 
 02.03.2010: Tulsa, OK 
 03.03.2010: Kansas City, MO 
 05.03.2010: Memphis, TN 
 06.03.2010: New Orleans, LA 
 09.03.2010: Atlanta, GA 
 11.03.2010: Fort Lauderdale, FL 
 13.03.2010: Orlando, FL 
 22.06.2010: Tucson, AZ 
 23.06.2010: Las Vegas, NV 
 25.06.2010: Salina, KS
 26.06.2010: Kansas City, MO
 28.06.2010: Milwaukee, WI 
 30.06.2010: Cincinnati, OH 
 02.07.2010: Noblesville, IN
2011;

 19.03.2011: Bournemouth 
 24.03.2011: London
 03.07.2011: Wolverhampton
 06.07.2011: Glasgow
 07.07.2011: Manchester 
 09.07.2011: Nottingham 
 10.07.2011: Newport 
 12.07.2011: Bristol 
 13.07.2011: Southend 
 16.07.2011: Hampshire 
 19.07.2011: Hull
 21.07.2011: London 
 22.07.2011: Norwich 
 24.07.2011: London
 28.07.2011: Isle of Man 
 30.07.2011: Lokeren 
 31.07.2011: Svendborg 
 13.09.2011: Hollywood, FL 
 15.09.2011: Alpharetta, GA
 17.09.2011: Boston, MA 
 18.09.2011: Newark, NJ 
 21.09.2011: Philadelphia, PA 
 23.09.2011: Union Dale, NY 
 24.09.2011: Hartford, CT 
 27.09.2011: Montreal, QC 
 28.09.2011: Ottawa, ON
 30.09.2011: Toronto, ONT 
 01.10.2011: Windsor, ONT 
 04.10.2011: Minneapolis, MN 
 07.10.2011: Hammond, IN 
 08.10.2011: St. Louis, MO 
 11.10.2011: Cedar Park, TX 
 12.10.2011: Grand Prairie, TX 
 14.10.2011: Kansas City, MO 
 16.10.2011: Broomfield, CO 
 19.10.2011: Los Angeles, CA
 21.10.2011: San Jose, CA 
 22.10.2011: Las Vegas, NV
 24.10.2011: Portland, OR 
 25.10.2011: Seattle, WA 
 27.10.2011: Vancouver, BC 
 29.10.2011: Edmonton, AB 
 30.10.2011: Calgary, AB 
2012;

 09.03.2012: Padova
 11.03.2012: Genova 
 12.03.2012: Torino 
 15.03.2012: Paris 
 18.03.2012: Trieste 
 20.03.2012: Firenze
 24.03.2012: Milan
 23.04.2012: Tokyo
 27.04.2012: Kanagawa
 28.04.2012: Osaka
2013;

10.08.2013: Costa Mesa, CA

Personnel
 Roger Daltrey - Lead vocals
 Pim Jones - Slide guitar, Acoustic guitar
 Jay Leonhart - Upright bass

Charts

See also
Roger Daltrey discography

References

External links

1992 singles
1992 songs
Atlantic Records singles
English folk songs
Songs written by Roger Daltrey
Songs written by Gerard McMahon